Dhangar is a herding caste of people found in the Indian states of Maharashtra, Karnataka, Goa, Madhya Pradesh and Uttar Pradesh. They are referred as Gavli in southern Maharashtra, Goa and northern Karnataka, Golla in Andhra Pradesh and Karnataka and Ahir in northern Maharashtra (Khandesh region). Some Gavlis live in forested hill tracts of India's Western Ghats. Gavli, also known as Dange or Mhaske, and Ahir are a sub-caste of Dhangar. However, there are many distinct Gavli castes in Maharashtra and Dhangar Gavli is one of them.

History

Etymology
The word "Dhangar" is inscribed in a Buddhist cave in Pune district of Maharashtra. It is believed that this inscription has its origin between the first and the third century AD. Multiple theories have been proposed for the origin of the word Dhangar. It may be associated with a term for "cattle wealth". Bhagwan Lal Indraji maintains that it is derived from Sanskrit word Dhang which means hill. Syed Siraj-Ul-Hassan noted that some people of his time believed the term to come from the Sanskrit "dhenugar" ("cattle herder") but dismissed that etymology as being "fictitious". In Kannada, the word Danagãra means cowherd and is derived from Dana which means cattle. Dana is the tadbhava of Dhana, which comes from Go-dhana which means cattle in Sanskrit.

According to Shamba Joshi, Hatakara-Dhanagara (Hatkar-Dhangar) is a compound of two words of the same meaning. In Old Kannada, the meaning of Hatti-Kara (Hatkar) is Gavli (milkman/cowherd) and Hatti means cattle pen or fold. Patti in Tamil would mean cowstall, sheepfold, a measure of land sufficient for sheepfold, cattle pound, a hamlet, a village, a place. He observes that Hatti-Karas are descendants of Patti-Janas, people who were settled in the south of Narmada River during the Middle Ages. This region was called Hatta-Desa. He theorizes that the word Mar-Hatta comes from the word Hatta-Desa, the settlement of Hatti-Karas. After the 12th century AD, the civil strife between the Yadavas of Devagiri and Halebidu (Hoysala's capital) split this land into two, into Marhätta and Karnätaka. Saint Ramdas refers to the two parts, Hatak for Marhätta and Karnatak for Karnätaka, in one of his Aratis.

Subdivisions

Initially there were twelve tribes of Dhangar, and they had a division of labour amongst brothers of one family. The nation around Hingoli was called Bara-Hatti which means country of twelve Hatkar-Dhangars. These twelve tribes later formed three sub-divisions and one half-division. These three being Hatkar (shepherd), Gavli or Dange (cowherd) and Khutekar (wool and blanket weaver)/Sangar. The half-division is called Khatik (butcher). All sub-castes fall in either of these divisions. The number three and a half is not a random selection but has a religious and cosmological significance.

Historical migrations

The archaeological evidence and ethnographic data suggest that the contemporary Dhangar castes are the result of more than one migration from North-West India, between 4000 and 10000 BC. The density and distribution patterns of the different groups of Dhangars seem to have been guided by the suitability of the region for the sustenance of the animals that they traditionally maintained and the products of those animals on which the specific groups subsisted. Ethno-historic investigations among the Dhangars suggest that the Kannade, Unnikankan and Kurmar who speak Kannada were originally from Karnataka and might have migrated to the present habitats in Maharashtra at different points of time. Whereas Hatkar, Zende, Thellari and Dange trace their origin to a single caste in the remote past, Shegars or Sagar Rajputs claim that they have nothing to do with the Dhangars and are descendants from Rajputs of Rajasthan. Ahirs speak "Ahrani", also known as Gavli boli, a mixed dialect of Gujarati and Marathi and are closely related to the Ladshe and Dange who have supposedly come from Gujarat. On the other hand, Gadhari-Nikhar and Gadhari-Dhangar, having migrated from North India, speak Sanskrit and Hindi. Telangi speaks Telugu and probably migrated from Andhra Pradesh, the remaining groups speak Marathi. The Khatiks are said to have derived from Khutekars.

Past occupation

The Gavli or Dange Dhangars found in the coastal strip practiced cattle/buffalo herding and shifting cultivation. Ahir, Nikhar Gadariya , Halmat, Khutekar, Kurmar-Unnikankan, Mendhe, Shegar, Telangi, Unnikankan and Zade herded sheep and wove woolen blankets. Gadhri-Dhangar, Hande, Hatkar, Hattikankan, Kannade, Kurmar-hattikankan and Zende reared only Sheep. However, Hatkars in Sangli district also maintained cattle and some Zendes used to maintain ponies. Thellaris herded both sheep and cattle. Sangars were weavers of woolen blankets. Khatik Dhangars sold sheep/goat meat, but did not rear sheep. In the past, some Dhangars were Inamdars and some were tenure-holders, holding lands either by a share or by paying a lump sum for a certain period.

Dhangars were also known for producing fine breeds of cattle and ponies. Khillari cattle, a mixture with a breed of Mysore, was pioneered by a Dhangar of Nashik named Gowdia who owned cattle in Mysore state. Similarly, Dhangar or Khilari pony is considered the best breed of ponies in Deccan. It is believed that their superior excellence is due to the Dhangar's practice of castrating them.

Role in the Maratha Empire

Dhangars are noted for their martial qualities. A large number of Shivaji's most trusted Mawalas or Maratha footmen were West-Pune Dhangars. On the other hand, Hatkar Dhangars, who are found mainly in the former Nizam state, especially in Nanded, Parbhani and Vidarbha, are known as Bargi Dhangars or "shepherds with the spears" and were perhaps Bargirs or mounted troopers during the time of the Maratha Empire. However, Bargi or Bande Dhangar is a distinct sub-caste from them. Hatkars were in the army of Shivaji in large numbers and were known for their bravery in the Maratha Empire. "Naik" and "Rao" were the titles given to them. Hatkars were a dread to others and even Nizam was afraid of them. It is on the historical record that for restraining the Hatkars, Nizam had sought help from the British Indian army. While some sources claim Malhar Rao Holkar, Founder of the Maratha Indore state, belonged to the Hatkar Dhangar sub-caste, the bakhars of Holkar dynasty say that he was a Khutekar Dhangar.

Relationship with Deccan Yadavas
The word Yadava does not have known Indo European etymology. According to Franklin Southworth, it might be of Dravidian origin, meaning "herder". Yadu means goat or sheep in Tamil and Yaduvan means goat/sheep-herd. He further claims that Yadava is the original word and mythical Yadu is derived from Yadava by back-formation. Similarly, Kuri means goat or sheep in Kannada and Kuruba means shepherd. While in Kannada Danagara/Hattikara/Gavli means cowherd/milkman, in Marathi Dhangar/Hatkar (derived from Danagara/Hattikara) refers to shepherd and Gavli means cowherd/milkman. Similarly in Telugu, the word Golla is synonymous with Gavli but both Gollas and Kuruvas (Kuruba) engage in sheep/goat and cattle pastoralism, in that they either herd exclusively sheep, or a mixed herd of sheep and goats, or cattle. According to Sontheimer, Gollas and Hatkar-Dhangars underwent an occupational change from cattle keeping to sheep pastoralism because of the operational advantages offered by the sheep/goat pastoral system in the semi-arid grasslands. The original worshippers of pastoralist god Vitthal – the Gollas and Kurubas of Andhra Pradesh and Karnataka and Gavlis and Dhangars of Maharashtra, especially southern Maharashtra – are continued to be called "Yāḍavas" in Andhra Pradesh and Karnataka. Similar to them, several royal families who enhanced the magnificence of Vitthal's worship are called "Yādavas". These families elevated their traditional pastoralist god (Vitthal) into a form of Vishnu-Krishna and accorded high prestige to his worship.

Seuna Yadavas and Hoysala Yadavas were originally pastoralists, and ruled Marhatta and Karnataka respectively. Furthermore, Hoysalas was a Kannadiga power and epigraphic evidence suggests that Seunas too emerged from a Kannada-speaking background. In one of his Aratis, Saint Ramdas mentions that, because of the civil strife between Seunas and Hoysalas, the country of Hatkars (Hatta-Desa) was split into Hatak (Marhatta) and Karnatak (Karnataka). In Old Kannada, Hatti-Kara (Hatkar) means Gavli (cowherd). According to the traditional sources, Devagiri, the capital of Seuna Yadavas, was founded by a king who was a Dhangar Gavli. Moreover, Seunas are traditionally called "Gavli Kings".

Apart from Seunas and Hoysalas, Vijayanagara Empire's founders of the Sangama dynasty, Pallavas,  Rashtrakutas of Malkhed,  and rulers of Pakanadu and Kammanadu also claimed Yadava lineage. This claim legitimized the process of Aryanization. According to R. C. Dhere, two factors made it easy for medieval South Indian pastoralist groups to associate themselves to the famous Yadu family from the Puranas to which Lord Krishna belonged. First, by occupation these South Indian groups were herdsmen, cattle herders, just like the famous Yādavas in the Puranas. Secondly, the Puranas family were "Yādavas" and the South Indian pastoralists were "Yāḍavas". The difference between "ḍ" and "d" is subtle, and so Dravidian "Yāḍavas" became Sanskritized "Yādavas".

 Lord Vitthal is of Kannada origin and has Dhangar roots. He is still worshiped by Dhangars in his original pastoralist form. In Dhangar traditions he survives as a Gavli cowherd and continues his relationship with Dhangar's renowned popular god Biroba. Vithoba and Biroba are considered brothers by Dhangars and they worship them as inseparable companions. However, Initially they were worshiped independently among Dhangars. Present day Temple of Vitthal at Pandharpur, his original center of worship, is still surrounded by many Dhangar settlements and displays numerous marks of previous Kannada influence. Kurubas worship these gods as Vitthal and Birappa. Virupaksha, Virabhadra, Birappa and Biroba are the same god and are a form of Shiva. Virupaksha is a sanskritized version of Virupa, where Virupa means strange looking or ugly, indicating the strange three eyes of Shiva and aksha in Sanskrit means eyes. Birappa, also known as Virappa, and Biroba are honorific versions of Virupa, where "-appa" and "-ba" are honorific suffixes indicating fatherhood in Kannada and Marathi respectively. According to the traditional sources, founders of the Vijayanagara Empire, who belonged to the Sangama dynasty, were of Kuruba origin. Virupaksha was their family deity (kuladevata) and became the principal deity of the state during their reign. Moreover, Biroba/Birappa has been exclusively a god of the Dhangars and Kurubas. On the other hand, Vithoba and Venkateshwara are derived from the same god and are forms of Vishnu. However, they were initially worshiped as a form of Shiva and underwent vaishnavization process to be worshiped as a form Vishnu.  Yadava dynasties worshiped Vishnu and Shiva as a unity which are seen in the forms like Vithoba-Biroba, Vitthal-Birappa and Virupaksha-Vitthal. Emperors of Vijayanagara were devoted to both Virupaksha (earlier worshiped as Birappa) and Vitthal and built/extended their temples at both Hampi and Lepakshi, and Virabhadra temple at Lepakshi. Similarly, during the reign of Seunas and Hoysalas the temple of Vitthal at Pandharpur, under their care, grew from a small pastoral deity site to a major temple complex. Furthermore, Yadava Kings (Yadavarayas) of Tondaimandalam enhanced the worship of  Venkateshwara and built/extended Venkateshwara Temple at Tirupati.
Another form of Shiva worshiped by Dhangars in Maharashtra is Malhar (Khandoba). When Holkars, who were of Dhangar origin, came to power in the Maratha Empire, they increased the splendor of the worship of Malhar, who was their Kuladevata. Jejuri temple of Khandoba was substantially enlarged by Holkar queen Ahilyabai Holkar and her general Tukojirao Holkar. Similar to Dhangars, the Kuruvas in southwestern Andhra Pradesh worship Mallikãrjuna, the Kurubas in northwestern Karnataka and northwestern Andhra Pradesh are devotees of Mailãr, and the Gollas in Andhra Pradesh are worshipers of Mallanna. All of these gods are said to be incarnations of Shiva. They are not completely identical and share many common features. Historically, they may be traced back to a prototype god who made his appearance in the early Tamil (Sangam) literature of the second to fourth century AD in which he is called Murukan. Murukan, who is later identified with Kãrttikeya or Skanda, has especially one feature in common with other gods, namely that they all have two wives. One of his wife comes from the settled advanced communities who were either agricultural, but with a propensity towards cattle keeping, or the once influential merchant groups. The second wife of the god, often regarded as a concubine, comes from the pastoral communities.

Relationship with Yadavs
According to the 1891 Census of India, the pastoral class of Indian population was divided into two groups. First group was called cattle graziers which included Ahirs, Gopas, Gawali and Golla. The second group was called shepherds which included Gadaria, Dhangars, Kuruba, Idaiyan, Bharwad and Rabari.

In the early 1920s, the leaders from the North Indian Ahir and the Maharashtrian Gavli community, who founded All-India Yadav Mahasabha, insisted cowherds, herdsmen and milksellers all over India to call themselves Yadav, adopt the last name "Yadav", and practice vegetarianism and teetotalism. Various communities, all over India, who were traditionally involved in cattle related occupations enthusiastically followed these recommendations. They claimed descendancy from the Yadu dynasty of the puranas, hence the term Yadav, through the Abhira tribe and Lord Krishna, a cowherd, is the hero-god of Abhiras. This effort was part of the process of Sanskritization and Aryanization. Soon, the adoption of the name Yadav began to take traction.

Today, the Yadav society consist of different allied castes of several denominations such as Ahir in North India, Thetwar and Raot in Madhya Pradesh, Gavli in Maharashtra, Idaiyan in Tamil Nadu, Golla in Andhra Pradesh and Karnataka, and Gopas in Bengal. On the other hand, Dhangar society in India includes Dhangars in Maharashtra and Goa, Gadaria in North India, Bharwad in Gujarat, and Kuruba both in Karnataka and Andhra Pradesh. However, Dhangar Gavli is a distinct caste from Yadav Gavli in Maharashtra and Goa. Moreover, Ahirs of Maharashtra prefer to be known as Ahir Dhangars and Marathas of Indore (Madhya Pradesh), like Holkars, call themselves Dhangar Ahir. In North India the Ahirs, who call themselves Yadav, were at one time a wing of Dhangar society. Ahir is one of the gotra of Dhangars. Historians such as P. M. Chandorkar has used epigraphical evidence to argue that Ahirs and Gavlis are representative of the ancient Yadavas and Abhiras mentioned in the classical Sanskrit works. Furthermore, Khandesh region of Maharashtra, at one point ruled by the Abhiras, was formerly known as the land of the Ahirs, and Ahirs in the present day Khandesh region speak Marathi dialect which is continued to be called Ahirani.

Varna status
The Dhangars as a caste are a cluster of many endogamous communities which are traditionally categorised as Kshatriya along with the Maratha Kunbis and the artisan caste such as Kumbhars. According to Shyam Singh Shashi, 80 percent of gotras of Dhangars are similar to kshatriyas though 15 percent resembles those of Brahmins, Vaishyas and backward classes. While the social status of Dhangars outside Konkan region is on par with Marathas and Kunbis, in Konkan Dhangars are ranked below them. The status was determined by the essential economic importance of their occupation. Dhangars were seasonal migrants to Konkan and while they had good and enduring relationships with farmers they provided only a valuable supplement to agriculture.

The Shegar Dhangars, also known as Sagar Rajputs, were previously identified as shepherd by occupation and Shudra by Varna but later they changed their surname to Rajput and started  wearing sacred thread.

Dhangars employ Brahmins for religious and ceremonial purposes, and these Brahmins are received on terms of equality by other Brahmins. When Brahmins are not easily available, the elders of the caste perform the ceremonies. The marriage ceremonies of Dhangars do not differ much from those of Maratha Kunbis.

Affirmative action: Reservation in India

As per India's system of reservation, Dhangars are classified as Other Backward Class in Goa, Karnataka, Gujarat, Madhya Pradesh, Chhattisgarh, Uttar Pradesh, Uttarakhand and Delhi. In Maharashtra, they are classified as a Nomadic Tribe, which comes under Other Backward Class category. According to Gail Omvedt and Bharat Patankar, The group considering themselves "highest" in the Other Backward Class category are mainly the peasant castes (Jat and Kurmi in north India, Kunbi in Maharashtra, Vellalar in south India, etc.), close to these are the herding (Yadav, Dhangar, Kuruba) and gardening (Mali, Saini) communities. Ranging below these are the various artisan and service groups – goldsmiths, blacksmiths, potters, barbers, washermen etc.

Culture
Khandoba (literally "father swordsman"), the guardian deity of the Deccan is the favorite god of the caste and is worshiped every Sunday and on Saturday – the light sixth of Margashirsha day – with offerings of sweetmeats. Vithoba of Pandharpur is worshiped daily in every household. Biroba and Mhaskoba are other popular gods amongst Dhangars.

Gaja Nach, which literally means the dance of elephant, is a traditional dance of the Dhangars. Since it is considered auspicious, the dance is also performed at the time of temple festivals. The dancers also hold colorful scarves which when moved in a swaying manner suggest the fanning of elephant's ears.

Dhangari Ovi is a type of folk singing, which is about women's work songs and the epic-length performances of Dhangars, in which sung verses alternate with narrative passages in prose.

Current situation
Traditionally being shepherds, cowherds, buffalo keepers, blanket and wool weavers, butchers and farmers, the Dhangars were late to take up modern-day education. In Maharashtra, the Dhangars are classified as a Nomadic Tribe but in 2014 were seeking to be reclassified as a Scheduled Tribe in India's system of reservation. The Dhangar community's population in Maharashtra is around 1.5 crore, which is 13% of the total 11.25 crore (112.5 million) population of the state. Devendra Fadnavis, former Chief Minister of Maharashtra, had said that "The situation of the Dhangars in some areas of the state was worse than that of Scheduled Tribes, and the government was committed to providing them reservation under the ST category".

Dhangar vs Dhangad issue in Uttar Pradesh and Maharashtra
Dhangar (shepherds) is a sub-caste of the Gadaria caste in Delhi, Madhya Pradesh and Chhattisgarh, the Kuruba caste in Karnataka and the Bharwad caste in Gujarat. Gadaria, Kuruba are classified as Other Backward Class in those respective states while Bharwad is classified as Scheduled Tribe in Gujarat, in India's system of reservation. In Maharashtra, the Dhangars come under Nomadic Tribe category within the larger Other Backward Class category.
On the other hand, Dhangad (cultivators), also known as Oraon, Dhanka and Dom, are listed as Scheduled Tribes in the states of Maharashtra, Chhattisgarh, Madhya Pradesh and Orissa. In Bihar, Jharkhand and West Bengal Dhangad or Dom is listed as Scheduled Caste whereas Oraon as Scheduled Tribe.

According to the 27th report of Standing Committee on Labour and Welfare with regards to SCs and STs order (Second Amendment) Bill, 2002:

On 17 January 2019, the Scheduled Castes and Scheduled Tribes Research and Training Institute (SCSTRTI) wrote a letter to the Principal Secretary to the Government of Uttar Pradesh stating the difference between Dhangar and Gadaria, and that the Hindi version of the word Dhangar is धंगड़ (Dhangad), which is classified as Scheduled Caste in Uttar Pradesh, as per the Gazette notification issued in 1950 by the President/Indian Government. They recommended that the Gadaria community's धनगर (Dhangar) should not be included in the Scheduled Caste category and rather belong to the Other Backward Class category in the state of Uttar Pradesh. but nowadays the word Dangad is corrected as Dhangar and government of Uttar Pradesh also passed GO i.e Dhangar is sub caste of Gaderia.

Notable people

References

Bibliography

Further reading

 Baviskar, B.S., "Co-operatives and caste in Maharashtra: A case study". Sociological Bulletin, XVIII:2:1969:148-166.
 Chaubey Ganesh, "The Dhangar Songs", Folklore, Vol. I No 4, Calcutta, 1958, pp. 22–25.
 Malhotra, K., 1980a, "Inbreeding among the four Dhangar castes of Maharashtra. India". Collegium antropologicum, 3.
 Malhotra, K., 1980b, "Matrimonial distances among four Dhangar castes of Maharashtra", South Asian Anthropology, 1.
 Malhotra, K., 1984, "Population structure among the Dhangar caste cluster of Maharashtra", in J.R. Lukacs (ed.), The People of South Asia.
 Prasad Satyanarain. "Modern education among the tribals of Bihar in the second half of the 19th century". Man in India, LI:4:1971:365-393.
 Saksena, R.N., and Chinchalkar, "Dhangars and Gadariyas: The Most backward divisions of Indian tribes and caste". Vanyajati, XXV:2: 1977:14–17.
 Prof. Prabhu N Kokane,"Socio-Legal" Identification of Scheduled Castes/Tribes & Backward Classes (2007). Nanded, Maharashtra.

External links
 Dhangar gotra list
 Pastoral People Worldwide at Food and Agriculture Organization of the United Nations

Herding castes
Dhangar
Social groups of Maharashtra
Social groups of Goa
Ahir